South Carolina Highway 602 (SC 602) is a  state highway in the U.S. state of South Carolina. The highway connects Red Bank and West Columbia, via Springdale.

Route description
SC 602 begins at an intersection with SC 6 (South Lake Drive) on the southern edge of Red Bank, within Lexington County, where the roadway continues as Platt Springs Road. Just to the west of South Congaree, the highway curves to the northeast and crosses Red Bank Creek. It travels to the northwest of South Congaree and crosses Pole Branch. Then, it crosses over Savana Branch just before it starts traveling along the southern edge of Springdale. While along the edge of the town, it passes Columbia Metropolitan Airport. Between the intersection with John N. Hardee Expressway and Ermine Road and the one with Lexington Drive and Wattling Road, SC 602 travels just north of Midlands Technical College's Airport Campus. At the second intersection, it enters Springdale proper. It then passes Wil Lou Gray Opportunity School and Airport High School. The highway crosses over Sixmile Creek just before it crosses over Interstate 26 (I-26). Almost immediately, it leaves Springdale and enters West Columbia. SC 602 passes by the George I. Pair Education Center. Just before an intersection with Taylor Street, the highway crosses over some railroad tracks. A short distance later, it meets its eastern terminus, an intersection with Charleston Highway (unsigned U.S. Route 21 Connector) and 13th Street. Here, the roadway continues as D Avenue.

Major intersections

See also

References

External links

SC 602 at Virginia Highways' South Carolina Highways Annex

602
Transportation in Lexington County, South Carolina